Lega, whose official name is Lega per Salvini Premier (abbr. LSP or LpSP), is a right-wing populist political party in Italy, led by Matteo Salvini. The LSP is the informal successor of Lega Nord (LN) and, while sharing the latter's heartland in northern Italy, it is active all around the country.

The LSP was founded in December 2017 as the sister party of the LN and as a replacement of Us with Salvini (NcS), the LN's previous affiliate in central and southern Italy. The early LSP aimed at offering LN's values and policies to the rest of the country. Some political commentators described it as a parallel party of the LN, with the aim of politically replacing it, also because of its statutory debt of €49 million. Since January 2020 the LN has become mostly inactive, being supplanted by the LSP.
It came third in the 2018 general election and first in the 2019 European Parliament election. Like the LN, the LSP is a confederation of regional parties, of which the largest and long-running are Liga Veneta and Lega Lombarda. Despite misgivings within the party's Padanian nationalist faction, the political base of the LSP is in northern Italy, where the party gets most of its support and where it has maintained the traditional autonomist outlook of the LN, especially in Veneto and Lombardy.

In February 2021 the League joined Mario Draghi's government of national unity, providing three ministers, led by the party's deputy secretary Giancarlo Giorgetti, minister of Economic Development. Since October 2022 the party has participated in Giorgia Meloni's government with five ministers, including Giorgetti as minister of Economy and Finance and Salvini as deputy prime minister and minister of Infrastructure and Transport. The League also participates in 15 regional governments, including those of the two autonomous provinces, and counts five regional presidents, notably including Attilio Fontana (Lombardy), Luca Zaia (Veneto) and Massimiliano Fedriga (Friuli Venezia Giulia), who is also the president of the Conference of Regions and Autonomous Provinces.

History

Background

The Lega Nord (LN) was established in 1989 as a federation of six regional parties from northern and north-central Italy (Liga Veneta, Lega Lombarda, Piemont Autonomista, Uniun Ligure, Lega Emiliano-Romagnola and Alleanza Toscana), which became the party's founding "national" sections in 1991. Umberto Bossi was the party's founder and later long-time federal secretary. The LN long advocated the transformation of Italy from a unitary state to a federation, fiscal federalism, regionalism and greater regional autonomy, especially for northern regions. At times, the party advocated the secession of the North, which the party referred to as "Padania", and consequently Padanian nationalism. The party always opposed illegal immigration and often adopted Eurosceptic stances, joining the Identity and Democracy group in the European Parliament in 2019. Throughout its history, the LN formed alliances both with centre-right and centre-left parties, but, in general elections, it was usually part of Silvio Berlusconi's centre-right coalition and, occasionally, ran as a stand-alone party (in 1996, gaining its best-so-far result: 10.1% of the vote). In the North several regions have been led by LN members, notably including Veneto (since 2010) and Lombardy (since 2013).

In December 2013 Matteo Salvini, a member of the European Parliament and former editor of Radio Padania Libera, was elected federal secretary of the LN, after having prevailed over Bossi in a leadership election. To revive a party overwhelmed by scandals and which had reached historical lows in the 2013 Italian general election, Salvini led the LN though dramatic changes, first by re-orienting it toward the European nationalist right. In the run-up of the 2014 European Parliament election, Salvini formed an alliance with the French National Front led by Marine Le Pen, the Dutch Party for Freedom led by Geert Wilders and other alike parties on the issues of Euroscepticism, opposition to immigration and souverainism, leading to the establishment of the Identity and Democracy Party (ID Party). The League also started a brief co-operation with CasaPound, a far-right organisation. In December 2014 launched Us with Salvini (NcS), to put forward LN's issues in central and southern Italy.

Road to the new party

In the 2017 leadership election Salvini was confirmed LN's leader, defeating Gianni Fava, from the party's traditionalist wing. The May 2017 federal congress marked the "national" turnaround. In October 2017 Salvini announced that in the 2018 general election the party would be re-branded simply as "Lega" and would field lists also in central-southern Italy. On 14 December 2017 the "Lega per Salvini Premier" party was established by long-time LN member Roberto Calderoli and its constitution was published in the Gazzetta Ufficiale. LSP's official goals were the transformation of Italy "into a modern federal state through democratic and electoral methods" and the support of "the freedom and sovereignty of peoples at the European level". LSP's symbol was inspired from Donald Trump's campaign for the 2016 Republican Party presidential primaries in the United States: a blue rectangle with the words "Lega per Salvini Premier" in white, surrounded by a thin white frame. A week later Salvini presented the new electoral logo: the word "Nord" and the Sun of the Alps were removed, the word "Lega" and the representation of Alberto da Giussano remained, while the slogan "Salvini Premier" was added.

In the 2018 general election, the League gained its best-so-far result of 17.4% of the vote, becoming the largest party within the centre-right coalition and establishing itself as the country's third largest political force. After the election, the party formed an alliance with the populist Five Star Movement (M5S), which had come first in the election with 32.7% of the vote. The so-called "yellow-green government" was led by Giuseppe Conte, an independent jurist close to the M5S, and notably included Salvini as minister of the Interior. Since the government's formation, thanks to Salvini's approval as minister, the party was regularly the country's largest party in opinion polls, at around or over 30%. In the 2019 European Parliament election, the League won 34.3% of the vote, winning for the first time a plurality of the electorate, while the M5S stopped at 17.1%. In August 2019 Salvini announced his intention to leave the coalition with the M5S, and called for a snap general election. However, after successful talks between the M5S and the Democratic Party (PD), the incumbent government was eventually replaced by a new government led by Conte. The League thus returned into the opposition, together with its electoral allies of the centre-right coalition.

During 2019, along with the LN's membership recruitment in the Centre-North, the party launched a parallel drive in the Centre-South for the LSP, practically supplanting NcS. Finally, during a federal congress on 21 December 2019, the party's constitution undwerwent some major changes, including reduced powers for the federal president, the extension of the federal secretary's and federal council's terms from three to five years, the introduction of "dual membership" and the faculty given to the federal council to grant the use of the party's symbol to other political parties. With the end of its membership drive in August 2020, the LSP became active throughout Italy. The LN, unable to be dissolved because of its burden of €49 million debt to the Italian state, was instead formally kept alive, while its membership cards were donated to former activists.

2020 regional elections

Salvini's popularity was supposed to create better chances for the League to continue its winning streak in regional elections (the latest being the 2019 regional election in Umbria, where Donatella Tesei was elected president with 57.6% of the vote and the League obtained 37.0%), particularly in Emilia-Romagna, a large region long-governed by the centre-left coalition. However, in the 2020 Emilia-Romagna regional election the party's candidate, Lucia Borgonzoni, stopped at 43.6% of the vote and was defeated by incumbent president Stefano Bonaccini (PD). The League's list obtained 32.0% and came second after the PD. The LSP, which had already peaked in opinion polls after quitting the yellow-green government, continued a slow decline in opinion polls and would be eventually eclipsed both by the PD and the FdI during 2021.

In the 2020 Venetian regional election Luca Zaia, whose popularity was the result of a long-term focus on his home-region Veneto, was re-elected for a third consecutive term with 76.8% of the vote; Liga Veneta fielded two lists, including the League's official one and Zaia's personal list, which obtained 16.9% and 44.6%, respectively. In the Tuscan regional election, League's candidate Susanna Ceccardi was defeated in her bid to become president of Tuscany. The fact that the League had grown electorally only in Veneto and had lost appeal in other regions started to weaken Salvini's leadership, which was more or less silently contested by the "centrist" wing of the party formed by Giancarlo Giorgetti, Zaia and all of the party's regional presidents, from Lombardy's Attilio Fontana to Friuli-Venezia Giulia's Massimiliano Fedriga, who would become president of the Conference of Regions and Autonomous Provinces in 2021.

Draghi national unity government

In January 2021 Conte's second government fell after losing support from Matteo Renzi's Italia Viva party. Subsequently, President Sergio Mattarella appointed Mario Draghi to form a cabinet, which won support from the League, the M5S, the PD and FI. The League entered the new government with three high-profile ministers from the party's "centrist" wing: Giorgetti, the architect of the party's pro-Europeanist turn and close friend of Draghi, as minister of Economic Development, Massimo Garavaglia as minister of Tourism and Erika Stefani as minister for Disabilities. The party's support for Draghi's government stood in contrast to its Eurosceptic stances.

In June 2021 Salvini proposed a federation with FI and other centre-right parties supporting Draghi (thus excluding FdI), which has so far went nowhere, as well as a campaign for six referendums on justice along with the liberal Radical Party. In February 2022 five of the six referendums were approved by Italy's Constitutional Court, opening the way for a popular vote by June.

In the run-up of the 2022 Italian local elections the party launched a new organisation named Italy First in southern Italy. The League will run under the "Italy First" banner in most southern cities and, most notably, in the 2022 Sicilian regional election. According to Calderoli, who registered the new symbol on Salvini's behalf, Italy First could eventually become a new political party, possibly including also FI and other centrist parties. However, as the notion of replacing the League's symbol also in northern Italy was criticised by several party members, especially in Veneto, Calderoli ruled it out.

2022 general election and Meloni government
In July 2022 the M5S did not participate in a Senate's confidence vote on a government bill. Prime Minister Draghi offered his resignation, which was rejected by President Mattarella. After a few days, Draghi sought a confidence vote again to secure the government majority supporting his cabinet, while rejecting the proposal put forward by Lega and FI of a new government without the M5S. In that occasion, the League, despite calls from its regional presidents to do otherwise, as well as the M5S, FI and FdI, did not participate in the vote. Consequently, Draghi tendered his final resignation to President Mattarella, who dissolved the houses of Parliament, leading to a snap election.

In the 2022 general election the League, which was part of the winning centre-right coalition, won 8.8% of the vote, compared to 26.0% gained by the Brothers of Italy (FdI) and 8.1% by FI. As a result, Giorgia Meloni, leader of FdI, accepted the task of forming a new government and announced the Meloni Cabinet, which assumed official functions after each ministers were sworn in on 22 October. The League joined the new government with five ministers: Giorgetti minister of Economy and Finance, Salvini deputy prime minister and minister of Infrastructure and Transport, Giuseppe Valditara (a former aide to Gianfranco Miglio and co-author of the party's liberal-conservative manifesto) minister of Education, Calderoli minister for Regional Affairs and Autonomies, and Alessandra Locatelli minister for Disabilities. Prior to that, Lorenzo Fontana, from the conservative wing of the League, had been elected President of the Chamber of Deputies.

Internal debate and 2023 regional elections
In the wake of the disappointing result in the 2022 general election and the run-up to the 2023 Lombard regional election, some leading members of the party's traditional wing, rooted in Padanian nationalism, formed Comitato Nord (CN). The Committee was inspired by Umberto Bossi and, under the leadership of Paolo Grimoldi, a former leader of Lega Lombarda, and Angelo Ciocca, a member of the European Parliament, it attracted more than one thousand members in a couple of months. The inaugural event of the Committee, held in early December, was attended by some 600 people, notably including former ministers Roberto Castelli and Francesco Speroni. Contextually, provincial congresses were held in some of the party's strongholds: critics of Salvini affiliated with the CN narrowly won in Bergamo and Brescia, while the pro-Salvini wing retained Varese for a handful of votes and Roberto Marcato, a regional minister loyal to Zaia, was leading the challenge in Veneto. Also, four regional councillors affiliated with the CN formed a separate group in the Regional Council of Lombardy and were subsequently ejected from the party. In the meantime, another group of dissidents, led by Gianni Fava, who lost to Salvini in the 2017 Lega Nord leadership election and never joined the new party, formed the "Lombard Autonomist Movement" and supported Letizia Moratti for president, along with the separatists of Great North, in the regional election.

In the election, held in February 2023, Attilio Fontana was re-elected president with 54.7% of the vote, 20pp more than his closest opponent (while Moratti was a distant third) as well as improving the 2018's tally. While FdI became the region's largest party with 25.2%, the combined score of the Lombard League and Fontana's personal list was 22.7%. Also the North Committe, whose members might have voted Fontana's list in protest according to some sources, rejoiced, while being worried by FdI's largest party status. Contextually, the centre-right coalition won also in the 2023 Lazio regional election, in which the Leauge obtained 8.5% of the vote.

Political position and alliances
The League is usually described as a right-wing or far-right party at the international level. However, Miles Johnson of the Financial Times, interviewing Matteo Salvini, pointed out that most Italian media consider the party as centre-right. Moreover, according to Antonio Polito, columnist for the Corriere della Sera and a former centre-left politician, the League is "at least half centrist, surely it is entirely centrist in Veneto and Lombardy, both as electorate and political culture of its governors". Differently from Salvini, the party leaders holding institutional offices, such as ministers like Giancarlo Giorgetti or regional presidents like Luca Zaia and Massimiliano Fedriga, are frequently described as "moderates", appealing to "centrist" voters and parties. The "far-right" label is rejected altogether by the party and, according to Salvini, "Italians are not a population of extremists, much less racists. We govern much of the country, and they would not vote for us if we were extremists. There is a lot of laziness on the part of the foreign press, because on the economic front we are absolutely liberal".

The League is formally part of the centre-right coalition, along with Forza Italia (FI) and the Brothers of Italy (FdI), but since 2018 the party has formed coalition governments both with the populist Five Star Movement (M5S) and the centre-left Democratic Party (PD). In early 2022, two leading Democrats, minister Dario Franceschini and Goffredo Bettini, hinted that the League could re-affirm a "centrist" position and could again form a coalition government with the PD after the next general election, respectively. Anyway, the PD's secretary Enrico Letta ruled it out.

In most regions the League forms coalitions with FdI and FI, while in South Tyrol it has teamed up with the South Tyrolean People's Party (SVP) since 2018. In Sardinia it has close ties with the Sardinian Action Party (PSd'Az), whose leader and president of the region Christian Solinas is often counted among the League's governors, so that, since 2018, there has been a "League–Salvini Premier–Sardinian Action Party" joint parliamentary group in the Senate. Finally, in Sicily the League has formed a federation with the Movement for Autonomy.

Ideology, platform and factions

While continuing to support autonomism, regionalism and federalism, under Salvini the League has gradually but decidedly set aside Padanian nationalism and separatism, which were long pursued by Lega Nord. Through souverainism, the party has also been making inroads in southern Italy. It is actually a matter of debate whether the League has embraced Italian nationalism and abandoned regionalism, or whether it combines nationalism and regionalism, similarly to the Ticino League in Switzerland.

The League supports the implementation of article 116 of the Italian Constitution, the so-called "differentiated" or "asymmetrical" regionalism, that is the attribution of "particular forms and conditions of autonomy" also to Regions with ordinary statute (with the consequent possibility for some Regions to have further powers than others, but still less than the five Regions with special statute).

The party's political manifesto, penned by Alessandro Amadori and Giuseppe Valditara in 2022, was described by the Corriere della Sera as liberal-conservative. More specifically, its authours wisely designed a "country that should be liberal in its economy and society, wisely conservative on values, profoundly republican in its collective culture".

In home affairs, the League strongly opposes illegal immigration, especially migratory flows from the sea. It is highly critical of non-governmental organisations transporting migrants to European cross-border countries, as they are believed to be complicit in "human trafficking". Within Italy's borders, the League is sceptical of asylum requests and related reception centers and hopes for the deportation of irregular immigrants. It has tried to regulate some of the immigration issues through the so-called "security decrees".

In foreign policy, the party is Atlanticist and pro-Israel, but has also supported friendlier ties with Russia and has long opposed sanctions against it.

Until 2018, the League expressed a strong opposition to the Euro currency and in the 2018 general election Eurosceptic professors Alberto Bagnai and Claudio Borghi were elected in Parliament for the party. Following President Sergio Mattarella's rejection of the appointment of Paolo Savona (who had expressed himself on a "plan B" for Italy's exit from the Eurozone) as minister of the Economy in Giuseppe Conte's first government, the League reviewed its opposition to the single currency.

In economic policy, the League supports the reduction of the tax burden and the implementation of a flat income tax at 15%, while opposing limits to cash payments. As a result, according to some sources, the party is distinctly "neo-liberal", while other observers have contested any such characterisation and the League would be torn between "economic liberalism" and "Keynesian economics". For instance, Giorgetti is usually considered a liberal, while Bagnai (the party's economic spokesperson) identifies as "post-Keynesian" and "left-wing populist".

On welfare, the League is one of the major critics of the increase in the retirement age envisaged by Elsa Fornero's 2011 pension reform and during Conte's first government got the approval of the so-called "Quota 100" (retirement with 62 years of age and 38 of contributions). Furthermore, the party opposes the citizens' income and regrets having voted for it in 2018.

Political communication

Since 2014, the political communication and propaganda of Salvini and the League have been entrusted to an external communication company, the "Sistema Intranet snc" of Luca Morisi and Andrea Paganella. This company uses a software known as "the Beast" which, through a series of algorithms (based on monitoring the sentiments of the network), according to many commentators, has contributed to Matteo Salvini's success on social networks. According to the various reconstructions it would be through this software that political messages, slogans, successful hashtags and scenes from Salvini's daily life would be selected. The communication strategy of the Beast was analysed in a study by the Department of Political Sciences of the University of Padua, which states that Salvini "opened the page in 2010 ... with a strategy that is still considered effective today ... able to be in tune with the prevailing moods of a substantial part of users on the network". Morisi's ability consists in "positioning himself on the right and majority side of public opinion" and being « able to analyse in real time the orientation of comments and reactions to a post and suggesting which topics to focus on in the next post ». Morisi also invented the nickname "The Captain", with which Salvini is called by his supporters.

On 23 September 2021 Morisi resigned as spin doctor of the League's political communication for "personal and family problems". Four days later Morisi was investigated following an accusation of cocaine transfer by two Romanian boys, a case for which the Public Prosecutor's Office of Verona requested archiving on 30 November.

Regional and local government
The League participates in 15 out of 21 sub-national governments (Italy has 20 regions, one of which, Trentino-Alto Adige/Südtirol, is composed of two autonomous provinces with dinstict autonony and a seat each in the Conference of Regions and Autonomous Provinces: Trentino and South Tyrol). The following is a list of the most relevant local institutions led by party members.

Presidents of Regions
Lombardy (9,965,046 inhabitants): Attilio Fontana
Veneto (4,854,633 inhabitants): Luca Zaia
Friuli-Venezia Giulia (1,197,295 inhabitants): Massimiliano Fedriga
Umbria (859,572 inhabitants): Donatella Tesei

Presidents of Autonomous Provinces
Trentino (542,58 inhabitants): Maurizio Fugatti (also President of Trentino-Alto Adige/Südtirol, a rotational role).

Presidents of Provinces
Verona (Veneto, 927,108 inhabitants): Manuel Scalzotto
Treviso (Veneto, 876,755 inhabitants): Stefano Marcon
Monza and Brianza (Lombardy, 870,112 inhabitants): Luca Santambrogio
Pavia (Lombardy, 534,691 inhabitants): Giovanni Palli
Pescara (Abruzzo, 313,346 inhabitants): Ottavio De Martinis
Macerata (Marche, 305,249 inhabitants): Sandro Parcaroli
Rovigo (Veneto, 229,097 inhabitants): Enrico Ferrarese
Asti (Piedmont, 207,939 inhabitants): Paolo Lanfranco
Vercelli (Piedmont, 165,760 inhabitants): Eraldo Botta

Mayors of Municipalities over 50,000 inhabitants
Ferrara (Emilia-Romagna, 131,091 inhabitants): Alan Fabbri
Terni (Umbria, 107,314 inhabitants): Leonardo Latini
Novara (Piedmont, 101,727 inhabitants): Alessandro Canelli
Udine (Friuli-Venezia Giulia, 97,761): Pietro Fontanini
Pisa (Tuscany, 89,828 inhabitants): Michele Conti
Treviso (Veneto, 84,793 inhabitants): Mario Conte
Sesto San Giovanni (Lombardy, 79,732 inhabitants): Roberto Di Stefano
Cinisello Balsamo (Lombardy, 74,534 inhabitants): Giacomo Ghilardi
Pavia (Lombardy, 71,159 inhabitants): Fabrizio Fracassi
Massa (Tuscany, 66,423 inhabitants): Francesco Persiani
Potenza (Basilicata, 64,786 inhabitants): Mario Guarente
Vigevano (Lombardy, 62,384 inhabitants): Andrea Ceffa
Foligno (Umbria, 55,520 inhabitants): Stefano Zuccarini
Gallarate (Lombardy, 52,826 inhabitants): Andrea Cassani
Montesilvano (Abruzzo, 53,174 inhabitants): Ottavio De Martinis
Anzio (Lazio, 58,247 inhabitants): Candido De Angelis
Civitavecchia (Lazio, 51,824 inhabitants): Ernesto Tedesco

Electoral results

Italian Parliament

European Parliament

Regional Councils

Leadership 
Federal secretary: Matteo Salvini (2020–present)
Deputy federal secretary: Giancarlo Giorgetti (2020–present), Lorenzo Fontana (2020–present), Andrea Crippa (2020–present)

Symbols

References

External links
Official website (1)
Official website (2)
Official website of Lega Nord

2017 establishments in Italy
Anti-immigration politics in Europe
Eurosceptic parties in Italy
Federalist parties in Italy
Lega Nord
National conservative parties
Nationalist parties in Italy
Political parties established in 2017
Right-wing populist parties
Member parties of the Identity and Democracy Party
Right-wing parties in Europe
Right-wing politics in Italy
Conservative parties in Italy